Schineni may refer to the following places:

Romania
 Schineni, a village in Sascut Commune, Bacău County
 Schineni, a village in Săucești Commune, Bacău County
 Schineni, a village administered by Murgeni town, Vaslui County

Moldova
 Schineni, Soroca, a commune in Soroca district